is an organization for mystery writers in Japan.

The organization was founded on 21 June 1947 by Edogawa Rampo. It is currently chaired by Bin Konno and claims about 600 members.

It presents the Mystery Writers of Japan Award to writers every year. It also presents the Edogawa Rampo Prize to amateur writers who has had few or no novels published commercially.

History 
.

Awards 
The MWJ presents two annual awards.
 Mystery Writers of Japan Award (since 1948)
 Best Novel
 Best Short Story
 Best Critical/Biographical Work

 Edogawa Rampo Prize (since 1955): sponsored by Kodansha and Fuji Television, open to anyone who has had few or no novels published commercially. The winner receives a small bust of Edogawa Rampo and a prize of 10,000,000 yen. The novel of the winner is published by Kodansha. The members of the selection committee of 2012 are Natsuo Kirino, Natsuhiko Kyogoku, Ira Ishida, Bin Konno (ja) and Keigo Higashino.

Presidents 
 Detective Fiction Writers Club (of Japan)
 Edogawa Rampo (1947–1952)
  (1952–1954)
  (1954–1960)
  (1960–1963) 
 Mystery Writers of Japan
 Edogawa Rampo (1963)
 Seichō Matsumoto (1963–1971)
  (1971–1973)
  (1973–1979)
  (1979–1981) 
  (1981–1985) 
 Kawataro Nakajima (1985–1989)
  (1989–1993) 
  (1993–1997) 
 Kenzo Kitakata (1997–2001)
 Go Osaka (2001–2005) 
 Arimasa Osawa (2005–2009) 
 Keigo Higashino (2009–2013)
  (2013– )

Anthologies 
The MWJ started compiling the annual anthology of members in 1948.
 The Best Mysteries 2001 (Kodansha, Tokyo, 2001)
 The Best Mysteries 2002 (Kodansha, Tokyo, 2002)
 The Best Mysteries 2003 (Kodansha, Tokyo, 2003)
 The Best Mysteries 2004 (Kodansha, Tokyo, 2004)
 The Best Mysteries 2005 (Kodansha, Tokyo, 2005)
 The Best Mysteries 2006 (Kodansha, Tokyo, 2006)
 The Best Mysteries 2007 (Kodansha, Tokyo, 2007)
 The Best Mysteries 2008 (Kodansha, Tokyo, 2008)
 The Best Mysteries 2009 (Kodansha, Tokyo, 2009)
 The Best Mysteries 2010 (Kodansha, Tokyo, 2010)
 The Best Mysteries 2011 (Kodansha, Tokyo, 2011)
 The Best Mysteries 2012 (Kodansha, Tokyo, 2012)

See also 
 Japanese detective fiction
 Mystery Writers of America
 Crime Writers' Association
 Honkaku Mystery Writers Club of Japan

References 
 Shimpo, Hirohisa (2000), "Nihon Suiri Sakka Kyōkai". Nihon Misuteri Jiten(日本ミステリー事典), Shinchosha, Tokyo

External links 
 Official site
 Official English site

Crime fiction
Arts organizations based in Japan
Arts organizations established in 1947
Japanese writers' organizations
 
 
1947 establishments in Japan